Stigmella sesplicata is a moth of the family Nepticulidae. It is found in Japan (Kyushu).

The larvae feed on Rhododendron species. They probably mine the leaves of their host plant.

Taxonomy
It was previously treated as a synonym of Stigmella lediella.

References

Moths described in 1985
Nepticulidae
Moths of Japan